Toft Monks is a village and parish in Norfolk, England. It is located on the border of Norfolk and Suffolk about eleven miles southwest of Great Yarmouth and four miles north of Beccles.

In 2001, the parish is recorded as accommodating 324 people in 131 households over 687 hectares, increasing to 348 at the 2011 Census.

The local church in the village is dedicated to St. Margaret and was originally constructed in the 13th century.

Toft Monks House is a Grade II listed Regency house built for local merchant William Grimmer in 1819.

See also 
 Clavering hundred

References 

  Office for National Statistics & Norfolk County Council, 2001. "Census population and household counts for unparished urban areas and all parishes."

External links 

 William White's History, Gazetteer, and Directory of Norfolk 1845
 Francis White's History, Gazetteer, and Directory, of Norfolk 1854 
 St Margaret's church, Toft Monks

Villages in Norfolk
Civil parishes in Norfolk